Y101 may refer to one of the following radio stations:

KRRY, of Quincy, Illinois
KWYE, of Fresno, California
WHYA, of Cape Cod, Massachusetts
WYOY, of Jackson, Mississippi
CKBY-FM, of Smiths Falls and Ottawa, Ontario, identified as Y101 from 2004–2013
DYIO, of Cebu City, Philippines

Y101 may also refer to:
 Yttrium-101 (Y-101 or 101Y), an isotope of yttrium